Chunella is a monotypic genus of corals belonging to the family Chunellidae. The only species is Chunella gracillima.

The species is found in Eastern Africa and Malesia.

References

Octocorallia genera
Chunellidae
Monotypic cnidarian genera